Leg Show was an adult fetish magazine published in the United States which specialized in photographs of women in nylons, corsets, pantyhose, stockings and high heels. The magazine features pinup style photographs and articles geared towards dominant women. The magazine achieved great success under editor Dian Hanson during the 1990s.

It was published by Mavety Media Group, which also published Juggs, Tight and Black Tail magazines.

A German edition, on the market since 1997, was published by Ediciones Zinco SA.

Leg Show is no longer being published, and the web sites for both the magazine and its publisher are now defunct.  The last issue of Leg Show magazine was published in August 2012. The company ended production without any type of notification or refund to subscribers or advertisers.

A similarly named magazine with very similar features was published by Selbee Associates in the United States, New York, N.Y. from 1962 to at least 1963. Among the contributors were artists Gene Bilbrew and Eric Stanton.

References

Bibliography 

 William D. Brame, Jon Jacobs, Different loving: the world of sexual dominance and submission, Villard, 1996, pp. 358,368
 Joseph W. Slade, "Pornography and sexual representation: a reference guide", in Pornography and Sexual Representation vol. 3, Greenwood Publishing Group, 2001, pp. 404–411
 Vibe, August 1998, p. 48

External links
R.I.P. Leg Show Magazine

Fetish magazines
Magazines with year of establishment missing
Magazines disestablished in 2012
Monthly magazines published in the United States
Pornographic men's magazines
Pornographic magazines published in the United States
Defunct magazines published in the United States